The 1957 Queensland state election was held on 3 August 1957.

Since the previous election in 1956, the Labor Party had split, with all but one of the ministry and a number of supporters forming the separate Queensland Labor Party.

By-elections
On 8 December 1956, Pat Hanlon (Labor) was elected to succeed Leonard Eastment (Labor), who had died on 29 July 1956, as the member for Ithaca.

Retiring Members
Note: Gregory QLP MLA George Devries nominated for re-election, but died before polling day; the election for Gregory was thus postponed.

Country
Tom Plunkett MLA (Darlington)

Candidates
Sitting members at the time of the election are shown in bold text.

See also
 1957 Queensland state election
 Members of the Queensland Legislative Assembly, 1956–1957
 Members of the Queensland Legislative Assembly, 1957–1960
 List of political parties in Australia

References
 

Candidates for Queensland state elections